In the United Kingdom the party conference season is the period of three weeks in September and October of each year, whilst the House of Commons is in recess, in which the annual political party conferences are held.

The Conservative Party Conference, Labour Party Conference and the twice-per-year Liberal Democrat Conference, representing the three largest UK-wide political parties, in terms of votes cast, hold their main annual conferences in the autumn.

In contrast to its main opponents' conferences, the Liberal Democrats grant all party members attending its Conference, either in-person or online, the right to vote on party policy, under a one member, one vote system. Among the three largest UK-wide parties, the Liberal Democrat Conference is also unique in providing a ring-fenced Access Fund, which defrays travel and accommodation costs for both disabled and low-income attendees.

UK-wide political party conferences have traditionally taken place in seaside resorts such as Blackpool, Brighton and Bournemouth, largely due to there being plenty of cheap accommodation available in such towns at the end of the summer holiday season. However, they are increasingly taking place in major cities with modern, purpose-built conference centres such as Birmingham, Liverpool and Manchester.

Conferences for the devolved Scottish and Welsh parties of the UK-wide Labour, Liberal Democrat and Conservative parties are held in March, while the Scottish Green Party holds two conferences each year – a one-day policy event alongside the devolved conferences in March and a two or three day main conference during the main conference season.

There is an unofficial agreement between the parties that they will stagger the timing of their conferences such that media attention be undivided, though smaller parties do not always abide by this rule firmly. In 2012, for example, there was an overlap between the Liberal Democrat and United Kingdom Independence Party annual conferences, with the latter concluding on the opening day of the former, and in 2013 the Liberal Democrat and Green Party of England and Wales conferences overlapped by three days.

2023 conference season 
The dates for the 2023 conferences are as follows:

Liberal Democrats - Bournemouth International Centre - Saturday 23 September to Tuesday 26 September 
Conservatives - Manchester Central Convention Complex - Sunday 1 October to - Wednesday 4 October 
Labour - ACC Liverpool - Sunday 8 October to Wednesday 11 October

2022 conference season 
Following the Death of Elizabeth II, the Liberal Democrats cancelled their planned conference whilst Trades Union Congress rescheduled theirs, both as a mark of respect to the Queen. The dates and locations for the 2022 conferences were as follows:

Liberal Democrats - Brighton Centre - Planned Saturday 17 September to Tuesday 20 September (cancelled)
Labour - ACC Liverpool - Sunday 25 September to Wednesday 28 September 
Green Party of England and Wales - Harrogate Convention Centre - Friday 30 September to Sunday 2 October 
Reform UK - Birmingham - Sunday 2 October
Conservatives - International Convention Centre, Birmingham - Sunday 2 October to Wednesday 5 October
Trades Union Congress - Brighton Centre - Tuesday 18 October to Thursday 20 October (originally Sunday 11 September)

2021 conference season 
The Party conferences largely reverted back to physical attendance following their cancellation the previous year due to the COVID-19 pandemic, but some parties opted to keep their conferences online and some opted for a mix of both, with the dates and locations as follows:

Trades Union Congress - Online Only - Sunday 12 September to Tuesday 14 September
Liberal Democrats - Online Only - Friday 17 September to Monday 20 September
Labour - Brighton Centre - Saturday 25 September to Wednesday 29 September
Conservatives - Manchester Central Convention Complex - Sunday 3 October to Wednesday 6 October. 
Plaid Cymru - Aberystwyth Arts Centre - Friday 15 October to Saturday 16 October
Green Party of England and Wales - The Eastside Rooms, Birmingham - Friday 22 October to Sunday 24 October
Reform UK - Manchester - 1 October to 2 October
Scottish National Party - Online Only - Friday 26 November to Monday 29 November
UK Independence Party (UKIP) - The Dome, Worthing, East Sussex - Sunday 17 October - Monday 18 October

2020 conference season 
The dates and locations of the 2020 conferences were planned to be as follows:

Labour – Saturday 19 September to Wednesday 23 September at the ACC Liverpool
Liberal Democrats – Saturday 26 September to Tuesday 29 September at the Brighton Centre
Green Party of England and Wales – Friday 2 to Sunday 11 October at the online   https://www.greenparty.org.uk/conference/
Conservatives – Sunday 4 October to Wednesday 7 October at the  International Convention Centre, Birmingham

However, as a result of the COVID-19 pandemic all the physical party conferences were moved online. The Labour conference was replaced by an online event called "Labour Connected" from 19 to 22 September, the Liberal Democrat conference was rescheduled for 25 to 28 September and the Conservative conference for 3 to 6 October. The Scottish National Party conference was the last major party conference of the season, held online from 28 to 30 November.

2019 conference season 
The dates and locations of the Autumn 2019 conferences were as follows:

As a result of the defeat for the Government in Miller/Cherry, the September prorogation of Parliament was declared void, and Parliament sat from 25 September. This meant that the Labour conference was cut short and – after failing to win a vote for a recess – that the Conservative conference clashed with the sitting of Parliament for the first time.

The dates and locations of other 2019 conferences are as follows:

2018 conference season 
The dates and locations of the 2018 conferences were as follows:
Trades Union Congress – Sunday 9 September to Wednesday 12 September at Manchester Central
Liberal Democrats – Saturday 15 September - Tuesday 18 September 2018 at the Brighton Centre 
Labour – Sunday 23 September to Wednesday 26 September 2018 at the ACC Liverpool
Conservatives – Sunday 30 September to Wednesday 3 October 2018 at the International Convention Centre, Birmingham
Scottish Conservatives – Friday 2 March to Saturday 3 March 2018 at the Aberdeen Exhibition and Conference Centre (cancelled due to the "Beast from the East" storm)
Scottish National Party – Spring Conference - Friday 8 June to Saturday 9 June 2018 at the Aberdeen Exhibition and Conference Centre.
UKIP – Friday 21 September to Saturday 22 September 2018 at the International Convention Centre, Birmingham
Plaid Cymru – 5 October and 6 October at Theatr Mwldan, Cardigan
Green Party of England and Wales – Friday 5 October to Sunday 7 October at the City Hall, Bristol
Libertarian Party UK - Saturday 6 October at MK Conferencing, Milton Keynes
Scottish National Party – Annual Conference – Sunday 7 October to Tuesday 9 October 2018 at The SEC Centre, Glasgow
Cooperative Party – Annual Conference – Friday 12 October to Sunday 14 October 2018 at Mecure Grand Hotel, Bristol
Scottish Green Party – 20 and 21 October at University of Strathclyde Technology and Innovation Centre, Glasgow
Women's Equality Party - Friday 7 September  - Sunday 9 September  - Kettering Conference Centre

2017 conference season 
The dates and locations of the 2017 conferences were as follows:
Liberal Democrats – Saturday 16 September - Tuesday 19 September 2017 at the Bournemouth International Centre
Labour – Sunday 24 September to Wednesday 27 September 2017 at the Brighton Centre
UKIP – Friday 29 September to Saturday 30 September at the Riviera International Conference Centre in Torquay.
Conservatives – Sunday 1 October to Wednesday 4 October at the Manchester Central Convention Complex
Green Party of England and Wales – Saturday 7 October to Tuesday 10 October 2017 at the Harrogate International Centre
Scottish National Party – Sunday 8 October to Tuesday 10 October at The SEC Centre, Glasgow
Plaid Cymru – Friday 20 October 2017 and Saturday 21 October at the Galeri, Caernarfon
Scottish Green Party – Saturday 21 October and Sunday 22 October at the Edinburgh Napier University Sighthill Campus, Edinburgh

2016 conference season 

The dates and locations of the 2016 conferences were as follows:
Green Party of England and Wales – Friday 2 September to Sunday 4 September 2016 at the University of Birmingham
UKIP – Thursday 15 to Saturday 17 September at the Bournemouth International Centre, Bournemouth
Liberal Democrats – Saturday 17 September to Tuesday 20 September at the Brighton Centre, Brighton
Labour – Sunday 25 September to Wednesday 28 September 2016 at the ACC Liverpool, Liverpool
Conservatives – Sunday 2 to Wednesday 5 October at International Convention Centre, Birmingham
Scottish National Party – Thursday 13 to Saturday 15 October at the Scottish Exhibition and Conference Centre, Glasgow
Plaid Cymru – Friday 21 to Saturday 22 October at the Pavilion, Llangollen
Scottish Green Party – Friday 21 to Sunday 23 October at Perth Concert Hall and the Royal George Hotel, Perth

2015 conference season 

The dates and locations of the 2015 conferences were as follows:
Liberal Democrats – Saturday 19 to Wednesday 23 September at the Bournemouth International Centre, Bournemouth
UKIP – Thursday 24 to Saturday 26 September at Doncaster Racecourse, Doncaster
Green Party – Friday 25 to Monday 28 September at the Bournemouth International Centre, Bournemouth
Labour – Sunday 27 to Wednesday 30 September at the Brighton Centre, Brighton
Conservatives – Sunday 4 to Wednesday 7 October at Manchester Central, Manchester
Scottish Green Party - Saturday 10 to Sunday 11 October at the Clyde Auditorium, Glasgow. It was the party's most well attended conference so far.
Scottish National Party – Thursday 15 to Saturday 17 October at the Aberdeen Exhibition and Conference Centre, Aberdeen
Plaid Cymru – Friday 23 – Saturday 24 October at the Aberystwyth Arts Centre, Aberystwyth

2014 conference season 
The dates of the 2014 conferences were as follows:
Green Party of England and Wales – 5 to 8 September, at Aston University, Birmingham
Trades Union Congress – 7 to 10 September, in Liverpool
Labour – 21 to 24 September, in Manchester
UKIP – 26 to 27 September, in Doncaster
Official Monster Raving Loony Party –  26th, 27th & 28th Sept, in Llandrindod Wells, Powys
Conservatives – 28 September to 1 October, in Birmingham
Liberal Democrats – 4 to 8 October, in Glasgow
Scottish Green Party – 11 to 12 October, in Edinburgh
Plaid Cymru – 24 to 25 October, in Aberystwyth
Scottish National Party – 13 to 15 November, in Perth

At their annual conference, the Scottish National Party held a leadership election following Alex Salmond's announcement of resignation. Nicola Sturgeon, formerly Salmond's deputy, was elected as their new leader.

2013 conference season 
The dates of the 2013 conferences were as follows:
Trades Union Congress – 8 to 11 September, in Bournemouth
Green Party of England and Wales – 13 to 16 September, in Brighton
Liberal Democrats – 14 to 18 September, in Glasgow
UKIP – 20 to 21 September, in London
Labour- 22 to 25 September, in Brighton
Conservatives – 29 September to 2 October, in Manchester
Plaid Cymru – 11 to 12 October, in Aberystwyth
Scottish National Party – 17 to 20 October, in Perth

2012 conference season 
The dates of the 2012 conferences were as follows:
Green Party of England and Wales – 7 to 10 September, in Bristol
Trades Union Congress – 9 to 12 September, in Brighton
Plaid Cymru – 13 to 15 September, in Brecon
UKIP – 21 to 22 September, in Birmingham
Liberal Democrats – 22 to 26 September, in Brighton
Labour- 30 September to 4 October, in Manchester
Conservatives – 8 to 11 October, in Birmingham
Scottish National Party – 18 to 21 October, in Perth

See also
 Conservative Party Conference
 Labour Party Conference
 Liberal Democrat Federal Conference

References 

Politics of the United Kingdom

Annual events in the United Kingdom